Rudolf or Rodolphe (young in 943), was a Lower Lotharingian noble born into a family with connections to Utrecht. He is thought by some modern interpreters to have later had lordships in the Hesbaye (Dutch: Haspengouw) region which is now in Belgium, in a part which mostly came to be incorporated into the later County of Loon (French: Looz). He was a son of Nevelung, Count of Betuwe, and a daughter of Reginar II, Count of Hainaut, whose name is not known. He had two uncles, one paternal and one maternal, who were both named Rudolf, and various proposal have been made about how the three Rudolfs correspond to various references to "Count Rudolf" in the 10th century "low countries". Although his paternal uncle Rudolf is sometimes considered to have become a cleric, Jongbloed (2006) argued that he must have been a count, and that he certainly had a wife and offspring. There is no contemporary record of young Rudolf, the nephew, as a count, nor indeed as an adult.

There is one clear record of Rudolf, a 943 grant by his uncle Bishop Balderic of Utrecht, which was analysed by Léon Vanderkindere in his 1900 article. At this time, Rudolf and his brother Balderic were probably young, because Balderic was described as a boy (Latin puer) in 956 when he became Bishop of Liège. The places Rudolf stood to inherit an income from after his older brother were goods of the Abbey of "Hereberc" (Sint Odiliënberg): "Rura, Lithorp, Linne, Sulethum, Flothorp, Ascalon, Malicalieol en Curnelo", which are Roer, Lerop, Linne, Swalmen, Vlodrop, Asselt, Melick en Maasniel all near Roermond.

Joseph Daris, Léon Vanderkindere, and other historians since them, speculate that Rudolf held a County in the Hesbaye. Jean Baerten, writing in the 1960s was also a proponent of this position. Baerten added an argument that young Rudolf might be the Count Rodulfus who appears as 4th witness in a grant made in 967 by Countess Bertha, the mother of a Count Arnulf, presumed to be Arnulf of Valenciennes. This Bertha was proposed by Vanderkindere to be another child of Nevelung. In contrast, earlier mentions of a Count Rudolf in the same area were thought by Vanderkindere and Baerten to be Rudolf's maternal uncle, Count Rudolf of the Regnarid family.

However, Baerten agreed that Rodulf in Bertha's witness list showed no clear sign of being a count in the area. Instead the evidence points to men named Werner and Emmon and Eremfried being counts in Haspengouw in this period. Vanderkindere and Baerten proposed that Rodulf inherited Emmon's possessions by marrying his daughter, a proposal based only on the fact that in the next century one of the first known counts of Loon was named Emmo.

More recently Jongbloed (2008) has stated that Rodulf being Bertha's brother in this document is unlikely, because he is only placed in the 4th position. Furthermore, both he and other writers such as van Winter, have pointed out that the distinction made by Vanderkindere and Baerten between the names Emmo and Ehrenfried is not necessary, as one is known to be a short form of the other.

Nevertheless, Baerten's refinement of Vanderkindere is still the standard source, and Rudolf is still routinely proposed to be the father or grandfather of the three brothers found in this area in the next century: Bishop Balderic II of Liège, Count Arnuldus of Haspinga, and Count Gilbert of Loon.

Because of the incomplete records available, there is considerable uncertainty as to whether Giselbert, Count of Looz, was the son of Rudolf, which no old record suggests, or the son of an otherwise unknown person named in one much later record as Otto, Count of Looz.

References

Sources 

Jongbloed, Hein H., (2009) "Listige Immo en Herswind. Een politieke wildebras in het Maasdal (938-960) en zijn in Thorn rustende dochter", Jaarboek. Limburgs Geschied- en Oudheidkundig Genootschap vol. 145 (2009) p. 9-67

Vanderkindere, L. (1900) ‘A propos d´une charte de Baldéric d’Utrecht’, Académie royale de Belgique Bulletin de la Classe des Lettres et des Sciences Morales et Politiques (Bruxelles), 
Vanderkindere, Léon (1902) La Formation territoriale des principautés belges au Moyen Âge, Bruxelles, H. Lamertin,
van Winter, (1981) Ansfried en Dirk, twee namen uit de Nederlandse geschiedenis van de 10e en 11e eeuw link

External links
 Medieval Lands Project, Holland & Frisia, Graven van Betuwe

10th-century European people
Medieval Belgian nobility